The A-class torpedo boats were a class of German single-funnelled torpedo boat/light destroyer designed by the Reichsmarineamt for operations off the coast of occupied Flanders in the First World War.  The A designation was to avoid confusion with older classes and designs. They were known as "coastal torpedo boats" (German: Küstentorpedoboote) to differentiate from larger, ocean-going torpedo boats.

Six groups of vessels were built under the class between 1914 and 1918, increasing in displacement from 109 tons to 335 tons.  All had a raised forecastle, shallow draught, and carried one (for most) or two (for A1-A25)  torpedo tubes amidships.

A1–A25 

 A2 and A6 were sunk by British destroyers on 1 May 1915 during the Battle off Noordhinder Bank.
 A3 was lost in 1915.
 A15 was sunk by French destroyers on 23 August 1915.
 A13 was bombed in dock in 1917.
 A10 was sunk by mines in 1918.
 A7 and A19 were sunk by British and French destroyers on 21 March 1918.
 A1, A18 and A21–A25 surrendered and were stricken between 1921-1922.
 A11 and A17 were sunk during the Kapp Putsch in 1920.
 A4, A12 and A14 were abandoned in Antwerp after the German evacuation at the end of the First World War. Taken over by Belgium. Remained operational until 1927.
 A5, A8, A9,  A16 and A20 were interned in the Netherlands at the end of the war, and handed over to Belgium as reparations in 1919. Decommissioned in 1927 and most scrapped. A20 remained in use as training vessel and captured by Germans in 1920. Scrapped 1948.

A26–A55 

 A26–A29, A31, A33–A39, A41, A44–A46, A48, A49, and A52–A55 were surrendered and stricken between 1920-1921.
 A30, A40, A42 and A47 interned in the Netherlands at end of the war and allocated to Belgium in 1919 under Versailles Treaty. Discarded in 1927.
 A32 was sunk during the "Operation Albion" in 1917, raised and repaired in 1923, and served as Sulev in the Estonian Navy. Taken by Russia in October 1940, it was renamed Аметист ("Amethyst") and served in the Soviet Navy as a patrol vessel until scrapped in 1950.
 A43 was scrapped in 1943.
 A50 was mined in 1917.
 A51 was scuttled in 1918.

A56–A79 

 A56–A58 were mined in 1918.
 A59 was transferred to Poland in 1921, becoming . Became target ship in 1937 and captured by Germans in 1939. Sunk under tow.
 A60 was mined in 1917.
 A61 and A62 were transferred to Britain in 1920, scrapped in 1923.
 A63 and A66 were given to France in 1920, scrapped in 1923.
 A64 was transferred to Poland 1921 becoming . Stricken in October 1936 and scrapped.
 A65 was given to Brazil, and scuttled in Britain.
 A67 was scrapped incomplete in 1921.
 A68 was transferred to Poland in 1921, becoming . Converted to oil hulk 1939. Sunk by German bombers 3 September 1939.
 A69, A70, A74–A76, and A78 were stricken in 1920.
 A71, A73, A77 and A79 were mined in 1918.

A80–A91 

Renamed Podhalanin in 1922. Converted to oil hulk in 1939. Sunk by German bombers while under tow on 24 September 1939.
 A81, A86–A91 were stricken in 1920.
 A82 was scuttled at Fiume in 1918.
 A83–A85 were scrapped incomplete, 1919.

A92–A113 

 A92–A95 were stricken, 1920.
 A96–A113 were scrapped while still on the stocks, 1919

Citations

References
 
 

World War I torpedo boats of Germany
Torpedo boats of the Imperial German Navy